"The Call" is the forty-fourth episode and the ninth episode of the third season (1988–89) of the television series The Twilight Zone. In this episode, a man begins a relationship by telephone, and attempts to track down the woman on the other end of the line after she refuses to meet with him.

Plot
Norman Blane is a lonely man who spends his evenings watching the television and eating TV dinners. Attempting to order a music album from a television advertisement, he dials a wrong number. A woman named Mary Ann answers and they get to talking. She asks Norman to call again tomorrow, but only after 7 p.m. The next day, he discusses this with his co-worker Richard. Richard suggests he ask Mary Ann out.

That evening, Norman calls Mary Ann. He suggests they meet in person. She is adamantly resistant to the idea and only wants to talk on the phone. A week later, Richard suggests Norman call the phone operator and ask for the address which corresponds to Mary Ann's phone number so that he can scout out the location and contrive to run into her. The address is an art gallery but no one named Mary Ann works there. Norman calls the number while in the gallery and hears Mary Ann's phone ring. He follows the ring to a room with the sculpture of a woman. A patron tells him the sculpture is a self-portrait by Mary Ann Windebelle, her last work before she killed herself.

Norman calls Mary Ann that night and she says she saw him at the exhibit. She says it is lonely and dark where she is and that she should not have answered the phone when he misdialed. She breaks contact, no longer answering his calls. He returns to the art gallery and talks to the sculpture, telling it how much he loved talking to her, and that he feels without their conversations to look forward to he no longer has a reason to live. Tears run from the sculpture's eyes in response. That night, Mary Ann calls him and she tells him she heard what he said, and it reminded her of how she felt before she committed suicide. He tells her that he loves her and she asks him to come to her immediately, before she changes her mind. The art gallery is closed, but the door unlocks for Norman after he tries it. He embraces the sculpture, telling her that he wants to be with her forever. A security guard enters and finds two sculptures holding hands.

External links
 

1988 American television episodes
The Twilight Zone (1985 TV series season 3) episodes

fr:L'Appel (La Cinquième Dimension)